The 1941 NC State Wolfpack football team was an American football team that represented North Carolina State University as a member of the Southern Conference (SoCon) during the 1941 college football season. In its fifth season under head coach Williams Newton, the Wolfpack compiled a 4–5–2 record (3–4–2 against SoCon opponents), finished eight in the conference, and was outscored by a total of 143 to 122.

Schedule

References

NC State
NC State Wolfpack football seasons
NC State Wolfpack football